T. Q. Donaldson House, also known as the Dr. Davis Furman House, is a historic home located at Greenville, South Carolina. It was built about 1863, and is a two-story, frame, vernacular Italianate style cottage.  It consists of a two-story rectangular block with a one-story wing and one-story rear ells. Also on the property is a contemporary three-room frame, weatherboard outbuilding built for use as a kitchen and servant's quarters. It was built by William Williams for Thomas Q. Donaldson, a lawyer and member of the South Carolina Senate from Greenville County from 1872 to 1876.

It was added to the National Register of Historic Places in 1980.

References

Houses on the National Register of Historic Places in South Carolina
Italianate architecture in South Carolina
Houses completed in 1863
Houses in Greenville, South Carolina
National Register of Historic Places in Greenville, South Carolina